Sabrina Petra Ramet (born June 26, 1949) is an American academic, educator, editor and journalist. She specializes in Eastern European history and politics and is a Professor of Political Science at the Norwegian University of Science and Technology (NTNU) in Trondheim.

In 2008, the historian Dejan Djokić referred to her as "undoubtedly the most prolific scholar of the former Yugoslavia writing in English".

Personal life
Assigned male at birth, Sabrina Ramet was born in London, and is of Austrian and Spanish descent. She moved to the United States at age 10. She became a US citizen in 1966 at age 17. She served in the United States Air Force from 1971 to 1975 and was stationed at Ramstein Air Base in Germany. While stationed in Germany, she worked for the base newspaper, as a staff writer and later as editor. In 1973, she was a sergeant.

In December 1990, she started living as a woman and began using the name Sabrina. Ramet lived in England, Austria, Germany, Croatia, and Serbia before joining the Norwegian University of Science and Technology in 2001, when she settled in Norway. She continues to travel for her research in Eastern European history and politics, in Serbia, Croatia, Slovenia and Poland.

Education
Ramet was educated at Stanford University (A.B., 1971), the University of Arkansas (M.A., 1974), and University of California, Los Angeles (UCLA). She earned her PhD from UCLA in 1981.

Career and major publications
In addition to the current position as professor of political science at Norwegian University of Science and Technology since 2001, Ramet is also a senior associate at the Centre for the Study of Civil War as well as a research associate at the Science and Research Centre in Koper, Slovenia. She has written more than 90 journal articles and contributed chapters to various scholarly collections. She is the author of 12 scholarly books and has been editor of 35 scholarly books. She writes in her native English, but her books appear in Bulgarian, Danish, German, Italian, Japanese, Macedonian, Norwegian, Polish, Serbocroatian, Slovenian, and Spanish. Her translation of Viktor Meier's book, Wie Jugoslawien verspielt wurde, was published by Routledge in July 1999 in English as Yugoslavia: A History of Its Demise.

One of Ramet's early books, Whose Democracy? Nationalism, Religion, and the Doctrine of Collective Rights in Post-1989 Eastern Europe (1997), was reviewed in Terrorism and Political Violence.  Her 2006 book, The Three Yugoslavias: State-Building and Legitimation, 1918–2005, was reviewed in The American Historical Review, Foreign Affairs, East European Politics and Societies and The Journal of Modern History. In 2008, historian Dejan Djokic called Ramet "undoubtedly the most prolific scholar of the former Yugoslavia writing in English".

Debate
In 2007, Serbian sociologist, historian and writer, Aleksa Đilas, sparked a debate between himself and two authors, Ramet and John R. Lampe, by publishing a critique of "the academic West" in general, and Ramet's Thinking About Yugoslavia and Lampe's Balkans into Southeastern Europe books in particular.

In response professors Lampe and Ramet published a rebuttal of Đilas' critique in the same Journal of Southern Europe and the Balkans publication, in which both authors addressed his claims, while Ramet disputed his characterizations.

Memberships
Royal Norwegian Society of Sciences and Letters (since 2002)
Norwegian Academy of Science and Letters (2009)

Selected bibliography

Nationalism and Federalism in Yugoslavia, 1963-1983 (Bloomington, Indiana: Indiana University Press, 1984)
Nationalism and Federalism in Yugoslavia, 1962-1991, 2nd edition (Bloomington, Indiana: Indiana University Press, 1992)
Cross and Commissar: The Politics of Religion in Eastern Europe and the Soviet Union (Bloomington, Indiana: Indiana University Press, 1987) 
The Soviet-Syrian Relationship since 1955: A Troubled Alliance (Boulder, Colorado: Westview Press, 1990)
Social Currents in Eastern Europe: The Sources and Meaning of the Great Transformation (Durham, North Carolina: Duke University Press, 1991); 2nd ed. 1995Balkan Babel: Politics, Culture, and Religion in Yugoslavia (Boulder, Coloroado: Westview Press, 1992)Balkan Babel: The Disintegration of Yugoslavia from the Death of Tito to Ethnic War, 2nd edition (Boulder, Colorado: Westview Press, 1996)Balkan Babel: The Disintegration of Yugoslavia from the Death of Tito to the War for Kosovo, 3rd edition (Boulder, Colorado: Westview Press, 1999)Balkan Babel: The Disintegration of Yugoslavia from the Death of Tito to the Fall of Milosevic, 4th edition (Boulder, Colorado: Westview Press, 2002):  also published in Croatian and Macedonian translationsWhose Democracy? Nationalism, Religion, and the Doctrine of Collective Rights in Post-1989 Eastern Europe (Lanham, Maryland: Rowman & Littlefield, 1997) — named an Outstanding Academic Book for 1997 by Choice magazineNihil Obstat: Religion, Politics, and Social Change in East-Central Europe and Russia (Durham, North Carolina: Duke University Press, 1998)The Three Yugoslavias: State-Building and Legitimation, 1918—2005 (Bloomington, Indiana & Washington D.C.: Indiana University Press & The Wilson Center Press, 2006):  also published in Croatian and German translationsRellgija i politika u vremenu promene:  Katolicka i pravoslavne crkve u centralnoj i jugoistocnoj Evropi (Belgrade:  Centar za zenske studije i istrazivanja roda, 2006)The Liberal Project & the Transformation of Democracy: The Case of East Central Europe (College Station, Texas: Texas A&M University Press, 2007)Serbia, Croatia, and Slovenia at Peace and at War: Selected Writings, 1983—2007 (Berlin & Münster: Lit Verlag, 2008)The Catholic Church in Polish History:  From 966 to the present (Palgrave Macmillan, 2017)Interwar East Central Europe, 1918-1941: The Failure of Democracy-building, the Fate of Minorities'' (Routledge, 2020)

References

1949 births
Living people
American expatriate academics
American editors
American women journalists
American expatriates in Norway
American expatriates in Slovenia
British emigrants to the United States
English LGBT writers
Norwegian LGBT writers
Members of the Norwegian Academy of Science and Letters
Academic staff of the Norwegian University of Science and Technology
Royal Norwegian Society of Sciences and Letters
Stanford University alumni
University of California, Los Angeles alumni
United States Air Force non-commissioned officers
University of Arkansas alumni
Historians of the Balkans
Transgender women
Transgender military personnel
Transgender academics
American women academics
American people of Austrian descent
American people of Spanish descent
American transgender writers
English transgender people
Norwegian transgender people